The 2000 FIA GT Estoril 500 km was the second round the 2000 FIA GT Championship season.  It took place at the Autódromo do Estoril, Portugal, on April 2, 2000.

Race
Following an initial start, the race came under a caution period on Lap 13 due to heavy rain.  By Lap 23, the decision was made to stop the event due to worsening conditions.  The rain did not relent and the race was not restarted.

Due to completing less than half of the planned 120 lap race distance, half-points were awarded in the championships.  Also, since most teams did not have time to perform their required driver changes before the race was stopped, all assigned drivers were assigned points even if they never made it into the car.

Official results
Class winners in bold.  Cars failing to complete 70% of winner's distance marked as Not Classified (NC).

Statistics
 Pole position – #14 Lister Storm Racing – 1:38.427
 Fastest lap – #12 Paul Belmondo Racing – 1:51.370
 Average speed – 105.880 km/h

References

 
 

E
FIA GT